Ivan Lendl was the defending champion but did not compete that year.

Brian Gottfried won in the final 6–1, 6–4, 6–0 against Bill Scanlon.

Seeds

Draw

Final

Section 1

Section 2

External links
 1982 Fischer-Grand Prix Draw

Singles